This article is about the demographic features of the population of Vietnam, including population density, ethnicity, education level, health of the populace, economic status, religious affiliations and other aspects of the population.

Originating in northern Vietnam, the Vietnamese people pushed southward over two millennia to occupy the entire eastern seacoast of the Indochinese Peninsula. Ethnic Vietnamese, or Viet (known officially as Kinh), live in the lowlands and speak the Vietnamese language, as opposed to the many ethnic groups of Vietnam who are known to occupy the mountainous regions. The Kinh group does represent much of the cultural and political landscape of Vietnam.

Population

Historic estimates

UN estimates

Population pyramids

	

	

	

Source:

Vital statistics

UN estimates of births and deaths

Birth, death and fertility rates
The total fertility rate of Vietnam has been influenced by the government's family planning policy, the two-child policy.

Source: General Statistics Office of Vietnam.

Fertility rate by region and province

Source: General Statistics Office of Vietnam.

Ethnic groups 

The Vietnamese government recognizes 54 ethnic groups, of which the Viet (Kinh) is the largest; according to official Vietnamese figures (2019 census), ethnic Vietnamese account for 85.32% of the nation's population and the non-Vietnamese ethnic groups account for the remaining percent. The ethnic Vietnamese inhabit a little less than half of Vietnam, while the ethnic minorities inhabit the majority of Vietnam's land (albeit the least fertile parts of the country).

The relation between China and Vietnam also declined following reunification in 1975, with Vietnam siding with the Soviet Union against China in the Chinese-Soviet split. Tensions peaked when Vietnam and Cambodia started a war, Cambodia lead by Pol Pot being a Chinese ally, resulting in a Chinese invasion of Vietnam in 1979. In 1978-79, some 450,000 ethnic Chinese left Vietnam by boat as refugees (many officially encouraged and assisted) or were expelled across the land border with China. In recent years the government has performed an about turn and is encouraging overseas Hoa to return and invest, but the ethnic Chinese population has been in continuous decline since the 1970s due to assimilation and low birth rates.

The central highland peoples commonly termed Degar or Montagnards (mountain people) comprise two main ethnolinguistic groups--Malayo-Polynesian and Mon–Khmer. About 30 groups of various cultures and dialects are spread over the highland territory.

Other minority groups include the Cham—remnants of the once-mighty Champa Kingdom, conquered by the Vietnamese in the 15th century, Hmong, and Thái.

Language 

Vietnamese is the official language of the country. It belongs to the Austroasiatic language family, which also includes languages such as Khmer and Mon. Vietnamese was spoken by 85-90 million people in Vietnam at the 1999 census. In the early 21st century, around another four million Vietnamese speakers are found outside of Vietnam, mostly refugees from the Vietnam-American War. Thus Vietnamese is the most spoken language of the Austroasiatic family, being spoken by three times more people than the second most spoken language of the family, Khmer. Both languages, however, are extremely different: Vietnamese is a tonal, monosyllabic language while Khmer has remained non-tonal. Vietnamese was heavily influenced by Chinese, with up to around 50-70% words having Chinese origins, whilst Khmer was heavily influenced by Sanskrit and Pali, uses a abugida writing system, and has a great part of its vocabulary originating from Indian languages. Since the early 20th century, the Vietnamese have used a Romanized script introduced by the French, developed by Jesuit missionaries led by Alexandre de Rhodes and later on, refined by Vietnamese scholars to produce what is now known as the Vietnamese alphabet.

Religions

According to the 2019 Census, the religious demographics of Vietnam are as follows:
86.32% Vietnamese folk religion or non religious 
6.1% Catholicism
4.79% Buddhism (mainly Mahayana)
1.02% Hoahaoism
1% Protestantism
<1% Caodaism
0.77 Others
It is worth noting here that the data is highly skewered, as a large majority of Vietnamese may declare themselves atheist yet practice forms of traditional folk religion or Mahayana Buddhism.

Estimates for the year 2010 published by the Pew Research Center:

 Vietnamese folk religion, 45.3%
 Unaffiliated, 29.6%
 Buddhism, 16.4%
 Christianity, 8.2%
 Other, 0.5%

CIA World Factbook demographic statistics 

The following demographic statistics are from the CIA World Factbook, unless otherwise indicated.

Sex ratio

 at birth: 1.07 male(s)/female
 under 15 years: 1.08 male(s)/female
 15–64 years: 0.98 male(s)/female
 65 years and over: 0.63 male(s)/female
 total population: 0.98 male(s)/female

(2008 est.)

Source: Statista etc.

Life expectancy 

Source: UN World Population Prospects

Literacy

 definition: age 15 and over can read and write
 total population: 95.6% (2014 census); 95.8% (2019 census)
 male: 96.9% (no records); 97% (2019 census)
 female: 91.9% (2012); 94.6% (2019 census)
Source: The Worldbank Database etc.

See also 
 Racism in Vietnam
 List of ethnic groups in Vietnam
 Overseas Vietnamese

Sources 
 2006 Vietnam's population estimates
 1999 Census results
 Socioeconomic Atlas of Vietnam

References